Russell Moore may refer to:

 Big Chief Russell Moore (1912–1983), American jazz musician
 Russell Moore and IIIrd Tyme Out, American bluegrass band
 Russell D. Moore (born 1971), American Baptist theologian